Salvia dabieshanensis is a perennial plant that is native to Anhui province in China, found growing on hillsides and near thickets at  elevation.

Notes

dabieshanensis
Flora of China